Sanedo is type of Gujarati folk music, popularized by well-known Gujarati singer Maniraj Barot.

History
The original pronunciation and word is snehdo, derived from the word sneh, meaning love or affection. Sanedo contains couplets of four lines and has a striking resemblance to bhavai, a folk drama form from Gujarat. The Gujarati folk artist Arvind Barot performed sanedo on stage in the 1980s and deserves credit for bringing sanedo to the mainstream, but it was thanks to another Gujarati folk artist, Maniraj Barot, that Sanedo is famous among all Gujarati people and being played at Navratri and many wedding parties. A sanedo topic can be anything from romance or youth to satire.

Sanedo originated from the villages of the Patan district in Gujarat and it has become a very popular dance all over Gujarat and also among the Gujarati speaking population in other parts of India, United States, Australia, Canada and Britain. It is frequently played during the festival of Navratri, wedding celebrations and parties.

The music played in the background during a Sanedo recital is from a musical instrument called daklu. It is similar in shape to a drum but is considerably larger.

External links
 Informative blog about sanedo
 Sanedo in videos, audio, tips about sanedo, download links

Gujarati culture
Indian folk music